Yan Vichnyi (born 27 February 1997) is a Ukrainian professional footballer who plays as a goalkeeper for SC Poltava.

Career
Vichnyi is a product of FC Metalurh Zaporizhia and UFK Kharkiv youth sportive systems.

He spent his career in the Ukrainian Premier League Reserves club FC Vorskla Poltava. And in summer 2015 Vichnyi was promoted to the main-squad team of the FC Vorskla in the Ukrainian Premier League. He made his debut for Vorskla Poltava in the Ukrainian Premier League in a match against FC Dynamo Kyiv on 4 October 2015.

References

External links 
 Profile on FFU site 
 

1997 births
Living people
Footballers from Zaporizhzhia
Ukrainian footballers
Association football goalkeepers
Ukrainian Premier League players
FC Vorskla Poltava players
SC Poltava players